Bolitoglossa peruviana is a species of salamander in the family Plethodontidae.
It is found in Ecuador and Peru.
Its natural habitats are subtropical or tropical moist lowland forests, plantations, and heavily degraded former forest.

References

Bolitoglossa
Taxonomy articles created by Polbot
Amphibians described in 1883